Svenska Cellulosa AB (SCA, English: Swedish Cellulose Ltd.) is a Swedish forest industry company with headquarters in Sundsvall.

SCA is the largest private forest owner in Europe. It owns 2.6 million hectares of forest in northern Sweden, amounting to six per cent of Sweden's surface area and as big as the size of North Macedonia. The company also owns forests in Estonia, Latvia and Lithuania. SCA produces wood-based products, such as pulp, packaging paper and kraftliner. The company's sawmills, wood processing units and planing mills produce spruce and pine wood products.

The company leases land to wind farm operators and produces solid and liquid biofuels from its by-products. In December 2022 SCA acquired its first wind farm in Markbygden in Piteå municipality. In 2022, SCA's business units included Containerboard, Forest, Pulp, Renewable Energy and Wood.

It has approximately 3,600 employees and a turnover of approximately SEK 18.8 billion (€1.8 billion).

The company is listed on the Nasdaq stock exchange in Stockholm, Sweden.

Essity, a tissue paper company, was spun off from SCA in 2017 and is now a listed company on the Nasdaq stock exchange in Stockholm, Sweden.

History

1929–1999

SCA was established in November 1929, when Swedish investor Ivar Kreuger merged ten Swedish forestry companies. Between them the companies employed 6,500 people and owned forests, sawmills, pulp mills, machine shops and power plants. After Kreuger's death in 1932, control of the company passed to Handelsbanken.

SCA was listed on the Stockholm stock exchange in 1950. Axel Enström was the managing director from 1950 to 1960 and chairman of the board from 1960 to 1965.

SCA acquired Swedish hygiene products Mölnlycke in 1975.
 
In the 1980s, SCA acquired companies in France, Italy and Austria, including Laakirchen, a producer of uncoated printing paper.

In June 1990, SCA acquired Reedpack, a British packaging and paper company. In December 1990, SCA, by now Sweden's second largest forestry company, acquired a stake in Sweden's third largest forestry company, MoDo, which produced around half a million tonnes of fine paper annually. SCA produced about one million tonnes of different grades of paperboard per year.

In 1995, SCA became the largest forest industry group in Europe when it acquired 75% of the German company Papierwerke Waldhof-Aschaffenburg AG (PWA), which produced tissue paper and packaging board like SCA. Prior to the transaction, SCA had sold its power plant and its MoDo shareholding. Mölnlycke accounted for half of the company's turnover, with one third coming from packaging and the remainder from graphic papers. The company built a second Light Weight Coated machine at the Ortviken mill. Mondi of South Africa and SCA built a newsprint machine based on recycled fibre at Aylesford in the UK.

In 1998, SCA acquired corrugated board producer Rexam in the UK.

In 1999, SCA acquired packaging company Nicolet of France.

2000–2016

In May 2000, Metsä-Serla and SCA negotiated a share swap in which SCA would acquire a majority stake in Metsä Tissue, a tissue paper producer. Metsä-Serla acquired a stake in Modo Paper, which was co-owned by SCA and Holmen. The transaction was completed in June 2000.

However, the EU banned the sale of Metsä Tissue in January 2001, on the basis that the combined market share of SCA and Metsä Tissue in the Nordic countries would have become too large. SCA acquired Tuscarora, a company in the United States that manufactured tissue paper and packaging.

In February 2002, SCA acquired Italian tissue company Cartoinvest, and later in the year British tissue company Benedetti Paper Division.

In March 2004, SCA acquired the tissue paper businesses of Carter Holt Harvey in New Zealand and half of their joint venture Sancella.

In 2005, SCA had 50,000 employees in 50 countries. Due to fierce competition, it laid off 3,600 employees working on packaging and hygiene products in Europe. The Danish carton board plant was shut down and production was moved to Eastern Europe.

In March 2007, SCA acquired the European tissue paper business of US-based Procter & Gamble. In September, SCA and Norwegian energy company Statkraft announced the construction of seven wind farms in northern Sweden. The farms were designed to produce 2,800GWh of electricity a year, equivalent to approximately 2% of Sweden's total electricity demand. Of this amount, 500GWh was allocated to SCA. In December 2007, SCA announced that it would reduce its production activities in Sweden the following year due to increasing raw material and energy prices and overcapacity.

SCA delisted from the London stock exchange in 2008. SCA increased its ownership in Chinese tissue company Vinda.

In 2011, Norges Bank bought a stake of more than 5% in SCA.

In July 2012, the EU approved a deal in which SCA acquired the European operations of tissue paper company Georgia-Pacific. It employed 4,700 people in seven countries. SCA divested its packaging operations – excluding the two kraftliner mills in Sweden – to DS Smith.

In November 2013, SCA announced that it would buy a majority stake of almost 60% in Chinese tissue paper company Vinda.

In 2014, SCA was the most profitable forestry company in the Nordic countries. While other forestry companies were active in the wholesale market, its main customers were consumers. The company had 44,000 employees and sold its products in 100 countries.

In early 2015, Sverker Martin-Löf, chairman of the board, and Jan Johansson, CEO, resigned following a row over the private use of SCA's jet aircraft. Johansson and his family had used the company's aircraft for private flights, including to Dubai, Verona and Nice. Magnus Groth succeeded him. The Swedish Anti-Corruption Authority was investigating whether there were any criminal offences involved. At the same time, Martin-Löf also resigned from the listed investment company Industrivärden, where he was CEO, and which was one of the largest owners of SCA. In August the company announced that it would double its annual pulp production in Timrå to 900,000 tonnes. The investment amounted to approximately SEK 7.8 billion (€815m) and was expected to be one of the largest industrial investment in the history of Norrland. In October, the company acquired the American tissue paper producer Wausau Paper. In November, SCA announced that it would sell its stake in Industrivärden.

In summer 2016, insurance company Skandia and private equity firm Nordic Capital, among others, made a bid for SCA's forest operations and forests. In August, the company's board announced plans to split the company into two. The Tunadal sawmill was renovated. The Obbola mill was piloting the production of liquid biofuel. SCA sold the rest of its Asian mills to Vinda, China's largest tissue paper manufacturer. In December, SCA acquired BSN Medical, a German company that manufactured products such as bandages and plasters. SCA was the fourth largest forestry company in the world. Hygiene products accounted for 86% of its €12.3 billion turnover. The company's brands included TENA, Lotus, Libresse and Libero.

2017–2021
SCA and Essity became two separate companies in the summer of 2017. Tissue paper and health products, such as those produced by the Nokia paper mill, were transferred to Essity. SCA decided to focus on sawmills, pulp, board and paper mills, as well as forests and renewable energy production. The rationale for the split was that the synergies of the businesses had diminished over the years. SCA was mentioned on Greenpeace's "Wiping away" report for its role in the Great Northern Forest and contribution to global warming.

In March 2018, SCA announced that it would build a biorefinery in Timrå to produce transport fuel for cars and aircraft. The production was to use by-products from the Östrand pulp mill. In May, SCA announced that it would start co-operating with St1 in the production of renewable diesel. The pine oil-based fuel was to be produced at St1's refinery in Gothenburg. The modernisation of the Östrand pulp mill in Sundsvall doubled its capacity to 900,000 tonnes.

In August 2020, SCA announced that it would withdraw from the printing paper business and cease paper production at Ortviken in Sundsvall. In the future, the company planned to focus on tissue paper and packaging materials. The company invested 140 million euros in the production of chemical thermoplastic pulp (CTMP).

In autumn 2021, St1 and SCA announced their half-owned joint ventures called St1 Gothenburg Biorefinery Ab and SCA Östrand Biorefinery. The Gothenburg-based biorefinery would produce biofuel from pine oil and other renewable raw materials supplied by SCA.

Organisation

Businesses
In 2022, SCA is divided into five business units and supporting Sourcing & Logistics & Product Development units:
The Containerboard unit includes two paper mills that manufacture kraftliner. Kraftliner is used on the surface of corrugated board.
The Forest unit manages the company's forests in northern Sweden, Estonia and Latvia and buys wood from private forest owners
The Pulp unit includes pulp mills in Östrand and Ortviken
The Renewable Energy unit is focused on wind energy production on land owned by SCA. The other units produce bioenergy, such as solid and liquid biofuels, pellets and biochemicals, from by-products.
Wood includes sawmills, wood processing units and planing mills in Sweden. The unit mainly processes spruce and pine wood products, which are exported around the world

Owners
In December 2021, the company's largest shareholders were:
Industrivärden
Norges Bank
AMF Pension & Fonder
Handelsbanken Pensionsförsäkring
T. Rowe Price
BlackRock
Swedbank Robur Fonder
Vanguard
Insurance company Skandia

Products
SCA owns 2.6 million hectares of forest in Sweden, amounting to six per cent of Sweden's surface area. The company also owns forests in Estonia and Latvia.

SCA produces wood-based products such as pulp, packaging paper and kraftliner. In addition, the company's sawmills, wood processing units and planing mills produce spruce and pine wood products. The company owns wind turbines and produces solid and liquid biofuels from its by-products.

Criticism 
Several complaints have been filed against SCA because of its repeated practice of clearcutting, where large areas of forests are cut down uniformly, which in temperate and boreal climates leads to the release of large amounts of carbon stored in the soil due to its increased exposure to sunlight. As minutely documented by Greenpeace, SCA "clearcuts some of Sweden's last remaining old-growth forests, wiping away habitats of threatened species and endangering the livelihood of indigenous communities".

Awards
In 2014, SCA was named one of the world's most ethical companies for the seventh consecutive year by the Ethisphere Institute.

See also

Stora Enso
UPM (company)
Holmen

References

External links

 
Multinational companies headquartered in Sweden
Pulp and paper companies of Sweden
Personal care companies
Swedish brands
Holding companies established in 1929
Companies formerly listed on the London Stock Exchange
Companies listed on Nasdaq Stockholm
Manufacturing companies of Sweden
Manufacturing companies established in 1929
Ivar Kreuger
Swedish companies established in 1929
Sundsvall
Companies based in Västernorrland County